The Hannah Arendt Prize for Political Thought is a prize awarded to individuals representing the tradition of political theorist Hannah Arendt, especially in regard to totalitarianism. It was instituted by the German Heinrich Böll Foundation (affiliated with the Alliance '90/The Greens) and the government of Bremen in 1994, and is awarded by an international jury. The prize money is €10,000.

Laureates

References

External links 
  (English/French/German)
 Hannah-Arendt-Preis (2016 wayback archive version, in German)
 Hannah Arendt Award for Political Thought on Heinrich Böll Foundation website

Human rights awards
Totalitarianism
Politics awards
Awards established in 1994